Jeffery William Cook (born 14 March 1953) is an English former professional footballer who played in the Football League for Bradford City, Halifax Town, Plymouth Argyle and Stoke City.

Career
Cook was born in Hartlepool but began his footballing career with South African side Hellenic. Coach at Hellenic was George Eastham and he left in March 1977 to become manager of Stoke City and he brought Cook to Stoke in November 1977. He made to good start scoring in his second game against Blackpool but with Stoke having a poor season Eastham was replaced by Alan Durban in January 1978 and consequently Cook was loaned out to Bradford City. He scored once in eight matches for the "Bantams" and then scored five in seven for Plymouth Argyle. He returned to the Stoke first team in 1979–80 playing 14 matches which included four goals in three games. However, he was unable to maintain his run in the first team at the Victoria Ground and left for Plymouth Argyle in October 1981 this time on a permanent basis.

In 1981–82 at Home Park Cook scored 16 goals in 38 matches but he managed just five goals in 26 in 1982–83 and was sold to Fourth Division, Halifax Town. He spent two years at the Shay scoring ten goals in 65 appearances.

After leaving Halifax, he went on to play non-league football for Worksop Town, North Ferriby United and Ferryhill Athletic.

Personal life
Following the end of his professional footballing career in 1985, he worked for the PFA's Football in the Community scheme whilst playing part-time. In 1993, he qualified as a primary school teacher and spent his entire teaching career at Sacred Heart School in Hartlepool. He went on to become head teacher in 2010 before retiring in August 2017.

Career statistics
Source:

A.  The "Other" column constitutes appearances and goals in the Football League Trophy.

References

1953 births
Living people
Footballers from Hartlepool
English footballers
English Football League players
Association football forwards
Hellenic F.C. players
Stoke City F.C. players
Bradford City A.F.C. players
Plymouth Argyle F.C. players
Halifax Town A.F.C. players
Worksop Town F.C. players
North Ferriby United A.F.C. players
Ferryhill Athletic F.C. players
Schoolteachers from County Durham
Heads of schools in England